Edith Wolf (née Hunkeler, born 30 July 1972) is a Swiss former wheelchair racer, who competed in the T54 classification. Wolf competed at a range of distances from 400m to marathon length events and is a multiple World and Paralympic Games winner.  Wolf has also eight major marathon titles to her name having won the women's wheelchair race at the Berlin Marathon (2011), Boston Marathon (2002 and 2006) and New York Marathon (2004, 2005, 2007, 2008 and 2009).

Personal history
Hunkeler was in a car accident at age 22 which left her a paraplegic. She began wheelchair racing two years later.

Athletics career
At the 2004 Olympic Games, she finished 6th in the demonstration sport of Women's 800m wheelchair. She also participated in the 2004 Summer Paralympics, where she won a silver medal in both the 1500 metre and 5000 metre races. At the 2008 Paralympics, she took bronze in the 1500 metres and a gold in the marathon. She advanced to the finals of the 5000 metres, but crashed and caused a pile-up shortly before the end of the race. She broke her collarbone in the accident and was disqualified from participating in the re-run of the race.

She won the women's wheelchair division of the New York City Marathon in 2004, 2005, 2007, 2008, and 2009. She was  honored by New York Road Runners on November 1, 2018, during TCS New York City Marathon Race Week.

References

External links
 

1972 births
Living people
Swiss female wheelchair racers
Olympic wheelchair racers of Switzerland
Wheelchair racers at the 2004 Summer Olympics
Paralympic athletes of Switzerland
Athletes (track and field) at the 2004 Summer Paralympics
Athletes (track and field) at the 2008 Summer Paralympics
Paralympic gold medalists for Switzerland
Paralympic silver medalists for Switzerland
Paralympic bronze medalists for Switzerland
Paralympic wheelchair racers
People with paraplegia
Medalists at the 2004 Summer Paralympics
Medalists at the 2008 Summer Paralympics
Medalists at the 2012 Summer Paralympics
Athletes (track and field) at the 2012 Summer Paralympics
Paralympic medalists in athletics (track and field)
Sportspeople from the canton of Lucerne
20th-century Swiss women
21st-century Swiss women